Hannara is a genus of moths in the family Lecithoceridae. The genus was erected by Kyu-Tek Park in 2013.

Species
 Hannara buloloensis Park, 2013
 Hannara gentis Park, 2013

References

Lecithoceridae
Moths of Papua New Guinea
Moth genera